Symmoca attalica is a moth of the family Autostichidae. It is found in Greece.

References

Moths described in 1957
Symmoca
Moths of Europe